John Gerber may refer to:
 John Gerber (bridge) (1906–1981), American contract bridge champion player and captain
 John Paul Gerber (1945–2010), American historian, librarian, writer
 John Gerber, musician with The Flock

See also
 Eugene John Gerber (1931–2018), American bishop